Božena is a 2021 Czech Biographical miniseries directed by director Lenka Wimmerová. It is a miniseries about Božena Němcová. Czech Television planned to broadcast it in 2020, the year of the bicentenary of the writer's birth, but in the end it was moved to the beginning of 2021. Božena Němcová was portrayed by Anna Kameníková and Anna Geislerová while her husband Josef was portrayed by Jan Hájek.

The first episode premiered on 3 January 2021 on ČT1. The last episode was broadcast for the first time by Czech Television on 24 January 2021.

Cast and characters 
 Anna Kameníková as Barbora (Božena) Němcová, younger (episode 1 and 2)
 Anna Geislerová as Božena Němcová (episode 3 and 4)
 Jan Hájek as Josef Němec
 Lukáš Melník as medician Josef Čejka
 Jan Budař as medician Vilém Dušan Lambl
 Eva Josefíková as Antonie Reissová, Božena's friend
 Ondřej Malý as František Ladislav Čelakovský
 Martin Myšička as Václav Staněk
 Klára Suchá as Karolina Staňková
 Kryštof Hádek as Jaroslav Pospíšil, publisher
 Edita Valášková as Manka, Němec family servant
 Veronika Divišová as Dora Němcová, Božena's and Josef's daughter
 Prokop Zach as Karel Němec, Božena's and Josef's son
 Sebastian Vopěnka as Jaroslav Němec, Božena's and Josef's son
 Marek Daniel as Petr Faster
 Jan Nedbal as Václav Bolemír Nebeský
 Viktor Zavadil as tajný
 Vladimír Javorský as Johann Pankel, Božena's father
 Lucie Žáčková as Tereza Panklová, Božena's mother
 Václav Matějovský as Karel Havlíček Borovský
 Martin Finger as páter Václav Štulc
 Vladimír Škultéty as Karel Jaromír Erben
 Elizaveta Maximová as Johana Mužáková, née. Rottová
 Brigita Cmuntová as Žofie Rottová
 Adam Joura as Hanuš Jurenka, Božena's lover
 Jiří Maryško as František Náprstek-Halánek

References

External links 
 Official page
 

Czech Television original programming
Czech biographical television series
Czech historical television series
2021 Czech television series debuts
Czech television miniseries
Czech Lion Awards winners (television series)